2-Bromothiophene is an organosulfur compound with the formula C4H3BrS.  It is a colorless liquid. Unlike 3-bromothiophene, the 2-bromo isomer is prepared directly by partial bromination of thiophene.  It is a precursor to several drugs, including tipepidine, ticlopidine, and clopidogrel.

Safety
The LD50 is low, 200 – 250 mg/kg (oral, rat).

References

Thiophenes
Bromoarenes